Juan Velasco Damas (born 17 May 1977) is a Spanish retired footballer who played as a right back, and is a manager.

He played for seven clubs during his professional career, appearing in 213 matches in La Liga and scoring one goal. He also competed abroad in England and Greece.

Velasco represented Spain at Euro 2000.

Club career
Born in Dos Hermanas, Province of Seville, Velasco started representing professionally local giants Sevilla FC, appearing in 13 La Liga matches in the 1996–97 season, which ended in relegation. His league debut occurred on 5 March 1997 in a 0–2 away loss against Rayo Vallecano, and in the following two years he amassed nearly 72 official appearances, contributing prominently in the second as the Andalusians returned to the top level.

After helping Sevilla promote, Velasco joined Celta de Vigo, experiencing his most successful period: in the 2002–03 campaign he played 31 games to help the Galicians qualify for the first time ever to the UEFA Champions League. In the following season, however, he saw his team suffer relegation.

Velasco played the following three years with Atlético Madrid (two) and RCD Espanyol, averaging 22 contests per season. On 18 February 2008, after spending the first months of the new campaign without a club, he signed a three-month contract with Football League Championship side Norwich City, following a successful trial; at the end of the season he left for Panthrakikos FC, freshly promoted to the Superleague Greece.

After one-and-a-half seasons of relative playing time, Velasco moved teams in January 2010 but stayed in the country, signing with Athlitiki Enosi Larissa FC. He retired in June of the following year at the age of 34, and in 2013 returned to football, being appointed manager at Xerez CD B.

On 13 October 2016, Velasco signed as head coach of Extremadura UD.

International career
Velasco was capped five times by Spain, his debut coming on 26 January 2000 in a 3–0 friendly win over Poland (Cartagena). Selected for UEFA Euro 2000, he did not leave the bench.

Honours
Celta
UEFA Intertoto Cup: 2000

References

External links
 
 
 
 
 

1977 births
Living people
Footballers from Dos Hermanas
Spanish footballers
Association football defenders
La Liga players
Segunda División players
Segunda División B players
Tercera División players
Coria CF players
Sevilla Atlético players
Sevilla FC players
RC Celta de Vigo players
Atlético Madrid footballers
RCD Espanyol footballers
English Football League players
Norwich City F.C. players
Super League Greece players
Panthrakikos F.C. players
Athlitiki Enosi Larissa F.C. players
Spain under-21 international footballers
Spain international footballers
UEFA Euro 2000 players
Spanish expatriate footballers
Expatriate footballers in England
Expatriate footballers in Greece
Spanish expatriate sportspeople in Greece
Spanish football managers
Segunda División B managers
Extremadura UD managers